Trachycephalus is a genus of frogs, commonly known as the casque-headed tree frogs,  in the family Hylidae. They are found in Mexico, Central America, and South America. In a recent revision, the seven species of the genus Phrynohyas were included in this genus, and Phrynohyas is now considered a synonym of Trachycephalus. These frogs inhabit the canopies of tropical rainforests, where they breed in tree cavities, and seldom, if ever, descend to the ground.

Species

References

External links
 . 2007. Amphibian Species of the World: an Online Reference. Version 5.1 (10 October 2007). Trachycephalus. Electronic Database accessible at http://research.amnh.org/herpetology/amphibia/index.php. American Museum of Natural History, New York, USA. (Accessed: Apr 25, 2008). 
  [web application]. 2008. Berkeley, California: Trachycephalus. AmphibiaWeb, available at http://amphibiaweb.org/. (Accessed: Apr 25, 2008). 
  taxon Trachycephalus at http://www.eol.org.
  Taxon Trachycephalus at https://www.itis.gov/index.html. (Accessed: Apr 25, 2008).
  Taxon Trachycephalus at http://data.gbif.org/welcome.htm

 
Hylidae
Amphibian genera
Taxa named by Johann Jakob von Tschudi